Hannah Greely (born 1979) is an American artist.

Biography
Hannah Greely was born in Dickson, Tennessee, United States, and now lives in Los Angeles, California. Greely graduated from the University of California, Los Angeles, in 2002. She became an Artist in Residence at Bangkok University School of Fine and Applied Arts, Thailand in 2004. Greely also received the Louis Comfort Tiffany Foundation Award in 2005.

Exhibitions
In 2012, her solo exhibition "Bob van Orsouw" Gallery was displayed in Zurich, Switzerland. Wild Corner, Bernier/Eliades, Athens, Greece in 2011. At same year, she also had American Exuberance, The Rubell Family Collection/Contemporary Arts Foundation and American Contemprory Art from the Astrup Fearnley Collection.

Honors
2015 UC Riverside MFA Fellowship

2005 Recipient of Louis Comfort Tiffany Foundation Award

Articles
2007
Kathryn Hargreaves, “Modesty Blessed: An Interview with Hannah Greely. “ Citizen LA January. 2006
Robert L. Pincus, “ ‘Night’ watch.” San Diego Union Tribune March 19, 2006
Brian Gopnik, “ Red, White, and Bleak.“ The Washington Post March 2, 2006

2005
Christopher Miles, “The Idolater’s Revenge: New Los Angeles Sculpture.” Flash Art May–June 2005
Christopher Knight, “The next best ‘thing’ in LA.” The Los Angeles Times Feb. 9, 2005

2003
Michael Kimmelman, “Cramming it all in at the Venice Biennial.“ The New York Times June 26, 2003

2000
Jerry Saltz, “Realm of the Senses.” The Village Voice July 5, 2000

References

Living people
1979 births
21st-century American artists
People from Dickson, Tennessee
Artists from Los Angeles
University of California, Los Angeles alumni